The Lady class is a class of ferry that were operated by Harbour City Ferries and its predecessors on Sydney Harbour. The term 'Lady class' was also used to describe four wooden-hulled double-ended ferries that were operated on Sydney Harbour, from the 1910s to the early 1970s.

History
In late 1967, the Sydney Harbour Transport Board placed an order for three ferries with the State Dockyard, Newcastle. Continuing the tradition of naming ferries after the wives of the Governors of New South Wales,  was launched on 10 August 1968 and arrived in Sydney on 19 September 1968.

It was followed in 1970 by Lady Woodward and Lady McKell. These two differed from Lady Cutler in having reverse sloped wheelhouses.

In 1974/75, two enlarged versions were built by Carrington Slipways, Lady Wakehurst and Lady Northcott. These were followed in 1979 by Lady Street and Lady Herron that were built at the State Dockyard.

Following a fire that gutted the South Steyne in August 1974, the Lady Wakehurst and Lady Northcott were pressed into on the Manly service after having their bows built up to contend with the rougher conditions while crossing Sydney Heads and extra gangway openings cut into the upper deck. Following the Tasman Bridge disaster, Lady Wakehurst was sent to Hobart in January 1975 to operate services on the River Derwent, not returning until November 1977.

In the 1990s, the first three were withdrawn and placed in store at Rozelle Bay. A deal to sell them to Hong Kong fell through. Today, Lady Cutler and Lady McKell operate as cruise vessels on Port Phillip, the latter having had one wheelhouse removed and renamed Victoria Star. Lady Woodward was sold to Tasmania and converted for use as a salmon farm tender vessel. In 2010, it was sold to a citizen of Tin Can Bay for use as a houseboat.

Lady Wakehurst was sold to Auckland in 1997, before returning to Sydney in 2001. It briefly returned to the Manly run in 2006 when chartered by Sydney Ferries. It moved to the Solomon Islands in 2011. Lady Street was withdrawn in October 2002. and was sold in December 2004 to be broken up with her scrapping being completed at Goat Island in 2007

Lady Northcott and Lady Herron were removed from service in October 2017. In 2020 Lady Northcott was donated to Aboriginal Cruise company Tribal Warrior and sailed from Newcastle to Sydney, on the 26th of September 2022, under her own power after works were completed to get her back into service.

Vessels

See also
 List of Sydney Harbour ferries
 Timeline of Sydney Harbour ferries

References

External links

Ferry transport in Sydney
Ships built in New South Wales
Ferry classes